The 1980 NCAA Division II basketball tournament involved 32 schools playing in a single-elimination tournament to determine the national champion of men's NCAA Division II college basketball as a culmination of the 1979–80 NCAA Division II men's basketball season. It was won by Virginia Union University and Virginia Union's Keith Valentine was the Most Outstanding Player.

Regional participants

*denotes tie

Regionals

South Atlantic - Catonsville, Maryland
Location: UMBC Fieldhouse Host: University of Maryland, Baltimore County

Third Place - Mount St. Mary's 84, Benedict 82

New England - Smithfield, Rhode Island
Location: Bryant Gymnasium Host: Bryant College

Third Place - Quinnipiac 102, Bryant 97

North Central - Brookings, South Dakota
Location: Frost Arena Host: South Dakota State University

Third Place - Stonehill 70, North Dakota 57

South - Lakeland, Florida
Location: Jenkins Fieldhouse Host: Florida Southern College

Third Place - West Georgia 75, Bethune-Cookman 63

West - Tacoma, Washington
Location: Memorial Fieldhouse Host: University of Puget Sound

Third Place - Puget Sound 93, San Francisco State 86

South Central - Warrensburg, Missouri
Location: CMSU Fieldhouse Host: Central Missouri State University

Third Place - Central Missouri State 112, Jacksonville State 91

East - Erie, Pennsylvania
Location: Hammermill Center Host: Gannon University

Third Place - Cheyney 87, Gannon 86

Great Lakes - Dayton, Ohio
Location: Physical Education Building Host: Wright State University

Third Place - Wright State 88, Indiana State–Evansville 85

*denotes each overtime played

National Quarterfinals

National Finals - Springfield, Massachusetts
Location: Springfield Civic Center Hosts: American International College and Springfield College

Third Place - Florida Southern 68, North Alabama 67

*denotes each overtime played

All-tournament team
 Johnny Buckman (North Alabama)
 John Ebeling (Florida Southern)
 Larry Holmes (Virginia Union)
 Bobby Jones (New York Tech)
 Keith Valentine (Virginia Union)

See also
1980 NCAA Division I basketball tournament
1980 NCAA Division III basketball tournament
1980 NAIA Basketball Tournament

References

Sources
 2010 NCAA Men's Basketball Championship Tournament Records and Statistics: Division II men's basketball Championship
 1980 NCAA Division II men's basketball tournament jonfmorse.com

NCAA Division II men's basketball tournament
Tournament
NCAA Division II basketball tournament
NCAA Division II basketball tournament
NCAA Division II basketball tournament